Sam D’Allesandro (born Richard Anderson) (April 3, 1956 – February 3, 1988) was an American writer and poet. He studied at the University of California, Santa Cruz, and came to San Francisco as a young man in the early 1980s and published a book of elegant lyrics, Slippery Sins.

D'Allesandro was a member of the so-called "New Narrative" writers, which included Robert Glück, Bruce Boone, Steve Abbott and others. He reached out to other like-minded writers and contacted Dennis Cooper, Kathy Acker, Benjamin Weissman, David Trinidad, and Dodie Bellamy. With Bellamy he began an epistolary collaboration she was later to publish as Real: The Letters of Mina Harker and Sam D’Allesandro. A gay man, D'Allesandro died of AIDS in 1988, aged 31, leaving behind a body of work that ranges across various genre identities, from stories of one paragraph to fully developed novellas.  He is also the author of The Wild Creatures, which was published posthumously in 2005, edited by Bellamy's husband Kevin Killian. He is mentioned in Fairyland, A Memoir of My Father, by Alysia Abbott.

References

External links 
 Review of "The Wild Creatures".
 Kevin Killian reads D'Allesandro's story "Nothing Ever Just Disappears".
 "Bringing Back Sam," Bay Area Reporter 

1956 births
1988 deaths
University of California, Santa Cruz alumni
AIDS-related deaths in California
American gay writers
American LGBT poets
20th-century American poets
American male poets
20th-century American male writers
20th-century American LGBT people
Gay poets